Sergeyevka is a rural locality (a village) in Ilchigulovsky Selsoviet, Miyakinsky District, Bashkortostan, Russia. The population was 78 as of 2010. There is 1 street.

Geography 
Sergeyevka is located 47 km northeast of Kirgiz-Miyaki (the district's administrative centre) by road. Ilchigulovo is the nearest rural locality.

References 

Rural localities in Miyakinsky District